The canton of Bar-le-Duc-2 is an administrative division of the Meuse department, northeastern France. It was created at the French canton reorganisation which came into effect in March 2015. Its seat is in Bar-le-Duc.

It consists of the following communes:
Bar-le-Duc (partly)
Behonne
Chardogne
Fains-Véel
Vavincourt

References

Cantons of Meuse (department)